Tormented is a 2009 British black comedy slasher film directed by Jon Wright, written by Stephen Prentice, and starring Alex Pettyfer, April Pearson, Dimitri Leonidas, Calvin Dean and Tuppence Middleton. The plot centres on a group of students being stalked and murdered by the ghost of a bullied teenager. The film was released on 22 May 2009 in the United Kingdom by Pathé and was produced by BBC Films, Pathé, Slingshot Studios, Forward Films, and Screen West Midlands. It received mixed to positive reviews from critics, with many praising the humour and cast, but criticising the formulaic plot. The film earned £284,757 on a £700,000 budget.

Plot
Head girl Justine Fielding (Tuppence Middleton) is escorted out of Fairview High School by the police, as other pupils look on.

Five days earlier, Justine is reading the eulogy at the funeral of unpopular, asthmatic student Darren Mullet (Calvin Dean). Mullet's equally unpopular friend, Jason Banks (Olly Alexander), is (literally) thrown out of the church by the sadistic P.E. teacher after calling her a hypocrite because she did not really know him. Later, Justine agrees to go to a party with Alex (Dimitri Leonidas), organised by his popular friends, Bradley (Alex Pettyfer), Tasha (April Pearson), Khalillah (Larissa Wilson), Sophie (Georgia King) and Marcus (Tom Hopper).

When Justine arrives at the party, the DJ, Jez (Ben Lloyd-Hughes), egged on by Tasha, raps unflatteringly about her, before being thrown out of the party by Bradley. Bradley, Tasha, Khalillah, Marcus and Sophie all receive insulting text messages from Mullet's number. Later, Alex and Justine go to a bedroom and make out, only to be pranked by Bradley, wearing a clown costume and pretending to attack them with a chainsaw. Later, the 'in-crowd' toast Mullet. Justine admits that she did not know who he was. Jez goes to the cemetery and urinates on Mullet's grave. He is stabbed with a wooden crucifix by Mullet's ghost.

At school, Bradley threatens Nasser (James Floyd), the leader of the school's emo clique, about removing a website he had put up about Mullet. Justine drops her old friends Helena and Emily to hang out with the popular crowd. She finds a teddy bear (stolen from Mullet's grave) in her locker and, assuming it is from Alex, agrees to go on another date with him. Jason tells her that Mullet was in love with her and hands her his suicide note. In the school's recording studio, Mullet's ghost forces Nasser to listen to music at top volume through his headphones, rendering him permanently deaf.

Bradley and Marcus assault Jason, who they believe to be sending the text messages, but they are interrupted by another message, which Jason could not have sent. The P.E. teacher arrives, lets the bullies go and gives Jason detention. Later, Justine confronts Jason. He denies forging the suicide note, and tells her that Mullet killed himself because of bullying by the popular students, including vicious texts and a website that Bradley's gang created about him. Alex's friends tell her she cannot hand the note to the police, because it accuses Justine of hating him, thus supposedly implicating her in his death. The girls attack Justine's former friend Helena in the toilets; Tasha smashes her phone after accusing her of sending the messages. After swimming practice, Sophie tells Justine that she should sleep with Alex that night, but goes back into the swimming pool to retrieve her watch. She is attacked and drowned by Mullet's ghost.

Mullet's ghost brings flowers for Justine, but, after seeing her have sex with Alex, tears the badge from her uniform, and re-arranges her fridge magnets, calling her a "dirty slut". During football training Marcus becomes hysterical after seeing Mullet's ghost, and the P.E. teacher sends him off for a shower. Mullet's ghost then whips him with a towel, almost popping one of his eyes out its socket. He fights Mullet off with a cricket bat and gets outside, but is impaled through the skull upon an iron fence by the ghost. Later on, the gang have an argument at Bradley's house about who killed their friends, ending in Tasha fighting Justine and throwing her into the swimming pool.

Justine demands that Alex shows her the website, where she tearfully witnesses the in-crowd bullying Mullet. Justine realises that she ignored Mullet's pleas for help because he interrupted a conversation about her going to Oxford University. She tells Alex that their relationship is over.

After trying to dig up Mullet at the cemetery, Bradley breaks down and cries over the death of his friends. Tasha consoles him and they have sex in the car, but Mullet drags him out and rips off his penis, causing him to bleed to death. Tasha escapes and runs into an open grave, where Mullet decapitates her with a shovel.

Next day, Justine tells Jason, who is in the Art Room, that she was responsible for Mullet's death. He tells her that it was his fault, because he was scared of being bullied, so he told Bradley that Mullet fancied her. After she leaves the room, Mullet jams two pencils up Jason's nose and slams his head against the table, killing him. Justine vainly begs her old friends Helena and Emily to take her back, telling them that her new friends, including Alex, were all horrible.

Khalillah tells Justine that she received a text message from Tasha (who she does not know is dead) to meet in the Art Room. There Mullet places a plastic bag over Khalilah's head, before cutting off her hands with the guillotine. Justine and Alex arrive at the Art Room and find the bodies of Jason and Khalillah, and are attacked by Mullet. They stab him with a screwdriver and head to the common room, where Mullet nails Alex's hand to the floor with the screwdriver. Justine stops him, but he begins to choke her to death. She takes Mullet's inhaler and throws it across the room, telling Alex to break it. He does, and the ghost begins to die. Justine tells Alex to leave, but he finds Mullet's other inhaler, which Alex had hidden from Mullet when he was alive. Mullet then uses it, restoring his strength, and stabs Alex in the throat with the screwdriver before disappearing. The police arrive, having found Justine's badge near the bodies of Bradley and Tasha. She is led out into the police vehicle.

In a mid-credit sequence, the bullying gym teacher gives a speech to his students about how he was angry that Justine had killed his best players and ask why she did not kill them instead he sends the team away only to see Darren sitting, ready to kill him.

Cast

 Tuppence Middleton as Justine Fielding
 Alex Pettyfer as Bradley
 April Pearson as Natasha Cummings
 Dimitri Leonidas as Alexis
 Calvin Dean as Darren Mullet
 Georgia King as Sophie
 Mary Nighy as Helena
 Olly Alexander as Jason Banks
 James Floyd as Nasser
 Sophie Wu as Mei Lei
 Hugh Mitchell as Tim
 Larissa Wilson as Khalilah
 Ruby Bentall as Emily
 Tom Hopper as Marcus
 Peter Amory as Head Teacher
 Geoff Bell as Games Teacher
 Ben Lloyd-Hughes as Jez
 Roger Ashton-Griffiths as Mr. Humpage
 Dick Chaney as Ja Morant
 Thaddeus Griffin as Petchy
 Sandra Dickinson as Miss Swanson

Production

Development and filming
On 5 January 2009, it was announced that Jon Wright would direct a 2009 British comedy horror and slasher film titled Tormented which would be released in cinemas on 22 May 2009 in the UK. Cavan Ash, Tracy Brimm, Arvind Ethan David and Kate Myers produced the film with the budget of £703,000 and Stephen Prentice wrote the film. It was announced that Alex Pettyfer, April Pearson, Dimitri Leonidas, Georgia King, Larissa Wilson, Calvin Dean, Tom Hopper, Tuppence Middleton, Mary Nighy, Olly Alexander, Sophie Wu, Hugh Mitchell, James Floyd, Peter Amory, Ruby Bentall and Geoff Bell would star in the movie. Warner Bros., Paramount Vantage, MPI Home Video and IFC Films acquired distribution rights to the film. Paul Hartnoll would compose the music for the movie. BBC Films, Pathé and Forward Films co-produced the film. The film was shot at: Bishop Vesey's Grammar School, Sutton Coldfield, West Midlands, England; Streetly School, Birmingham, West Midlands, England and Sutton Coldfield, West Midlands, England, on 20 January 2009.

Soundtrack
 Dead In Love - Desert Sessions
 What Planet You On? – Bodyrox ft. Luciana
 Lesbian Roadkill - Tantric Dwarf
 Ride – The Vines
 Outtathaway! - The Vines
 Don't Be Afraid – Keaton Henson
 Dew Climbs - Lunz
 Monster Hospital – Metric

Release
The film was released in the UK on 22 May 2009. The world premiere took place on 19 May at the Empire Cinema, Leicester Square followed by a national premiere at Cineworld in Birmingham on 21 May 2009. Although a US release date of 10 July had been speculated, sources are lacking. The US release came over Paramount Vantage. The film ran on the IFC Festival 2009 on 21 September 2009. The film's budget was under £1 million ($1.5 million). IFC Films released the film in the US via on-demand service in late October 2009.

Home media
The DVD was released in the UK on 28 September 2009. It—along with the cinema release—was heavily cut in order to get a 15 rating. The DVD included an in-vision cast and director commentary and documentaries about the making of the film. The US DVD is unrated and was released on 31 August 2010.

Reception
The film has received mixed to positive reviews from critics. It holds a 69% rating and an average rating of 5.7 on Rotten Tomatoes from 27 reviews with the consensus stating, "It relies too heavily on American slasher cliches, but Tormented is a timely, funny and even somewhat touching entry in the high school horror genre". The film also holds 5.2 out of 10 on Internet Movie Database. Total Film magazine described the film as "A slasher for the Skins generation" and goes on to say "Tormented catches the spirit of the times without being too try-hard. Quips and snogging take precedence over scares, but its commentary on new technology’s power to intimidate is chillingly apt." and awarded the film 3 stars out of 5. Empire called it "cynical, gruesome fun" and "consistently funny" and awarded the film 4 stars out of 5. Sky Movies also awarded the film 4 stars out of 5. In the news awarded the film 9 out of 10, and Real awarded the film 5 stars.

Awards

See also
List of ghost films

References

External links
 
 

2009 films
2009 comedy horror films
2009 directorial debut films
2000s ghost films
2000s high school films
2000s slasher films
2000s teen comedy films
2000s teen horror films
British comedy horror films
British films about revenge
British ghost films
British high school films
British slasher films
British teen comedy films
British teen horror films
Films about bullying
Films about school violence
Films about suicide
Paramount Vantage films
Resurrection in film
Slasher comedy films
2000s English-language films
2000s British films
British horror films